Inside Burma: Land of Fear is a 1996 Central Independent Television documentary, written and presented by  John Pilger, which was directed by David Munro. The two men worked undercover in order to investigate the use of slave labour in Burma.

References

1996 television specials
British television documentaries
Documentary films presented by John Pilger
Films set in Myanmar
1996 films
1990s English-language films
1990s British films